Steven A. Baddour (born 1969) is an American attorney and politician from the Commonwealth of Massachusetts. He is a member of the Democratic Party and a former member of the Massachusetts Senate representing the 1st Essex District, which encompasses Amesbury, Haverhill, Merrimac, Newburyport, North Andover, Salisbury, and his hometown of Methuen. Before assuming office in 2002, Baddour worked as an Assistant Attorney General in the Office of the Massachusetts Attorney General.

Baddour served as the Chairman of the Joint Committee on Transportation and Vice-Chairman of the Joint Committee on the Judiciary. He also served as a member of the Joint Committees on Children & Families, Post Audit & Oversight, and Election Laws.  Locally, Steve is an active member of the Northeastern Legislative Caucus.

Baddour resigned from the Massachusetts Senate on April 2, 2012 to join McDermott, Will & Emery.

References

External links
Massachusetts Senate Member Directory Page
Steven Baddour Committee Biography
Official Steven Baddour Committee site

Living people
Democratic Party Massachusetts state senators
People from Methuen, Massachusetts
Massachusetts School of Law alumni
1969 births
University of Massachusetts Dartmouth alumni